The Uddin and Begum Hindustani Romanization scheme is an international standard for romanising (transliterating into the Latin alphabet) Urdu and Hindi (sometimes jointly referred to as the Hindustani language, particularly in the era of British India). Syed Fasih Uddin and Quader Unissa Begum presented the scheme in 1992, at the First International Urdu Conference in Chicago.

Uddin and Begum based their scheme on the work that John Borthwick Gilchrist and others began at Fort William College in Calcutta more than a century earlier. Gilchrist's romanisation system became the de facto standard for romanised Hindustani during the late 19th century.

Uddin and Begum attempted to improve on, and modernize, Gilchrist's system in a number of ways. For example, in the Uddin and Begum scheme, Urdu and Hindi characters correspond one-to-one. Also, diacritics indicate vowel phonics, whereas in the Gilchrist system the reader must infer vowel pronunciation from context. To facilitate Urdu and Hindustani romanisation in a much wider range of computer software, Uddin and Begum limited their character set to the common ASCII standard.

Romanization scheme

Notes:
 ^ is the hard sound. (representing with the caret)
_h    _H is the guttural sound.(representing with the Under Score)
’ is the long vowel sound. (representing with the Apostrophe)
(n)    (N) is the nasal sound of Nu'n, when if follows a long vowel and 	when sometimes used at the end of a word. (representing by enclosing it in The Parenthesis)
~ Gemination, which is the inter-junction of two vowels, with the first vowel casting a shadow on the second vowel.

Vowels

Short vowels
 a 		A
Sounds like English u in but, shut.
In Urdu: ab, adab, agar, ahmaq, kam.
 i		I
Sounds like English i in bit, hit.
In Urdu: kari, giri, ajnabi, bha'i.
 u		U
Sounds like English u in pull, bull.
In Urdu: Urdu, uda's, umda, ungli.

Note:	In traditional Urdu script these vowels sounds are not represented by any letters of alphabet. They are often omitted or sometimes represented by signs which are added to consonants and are termed "Eara'bs". "Eara'bs" representing short vowels are "zabar", "zaer" and "paesh".

Long vowels
 a'		A'
Sounds like English "a" in far, father.
In Urdu: a'ba'di, a'g, a'fat, a'm, ka'm.
 i'		I'
Sounds like English "ea" in heat, seat.
In Urdu: i'nt^.
 u'		U'
Sounds like English "oo" in tool, soon.
In Urdu: bu'nd, bhu'k, ju'ta, jhu't^.

Neutral vowels
Urdu has three neutral vowels, which are without long or short form.
 e		E
Sounds like English "ay" in hay, lay.
In Urdu: la'e, ga'e, c_ha'e, pic_he, pic_hhle.
 o		O
Sounds like English "o" in old, own.
In Urdu: os, ko, or^hna, roz, afsosna'k.
 y		Y
Sounds like English "y" in yard, young.
In Urdu: ya'r, ya'd, yaqin ha~ey.

Compound vowels
 A~i		A~I
In Urdu: a~isa, a~ina
 A~u		A~U
In Urdu: a~urat
 A~y		A~Y
In Urdu: a~ya, a~yanda

Double vowels
Inter-junction of two vowels, with the first vowel casting a shadow on the second vowel. The two vowels are separated by a ~ Tilde. The following examples illustrates the case of double vowels. In traditional notations this is referred as HUMZA.

 Kaha~e         A'~i’         La'~e         La'~o         Li’~ye
 Ga~e           Ha~ey         Ga~i’         A'~u(n)       Kiji~ye

Nasal Nu'n
Is the nasal sound of Nu'n, when if follows a long vowel and when sometimes used at the end of a word. (representing by enclosing in The Parenthesis). The following examples illustrates the case of Nasal Nu'n. In traditional notations this is referred as Nu'n-e-g_huna.

 Ma(n)        Ha(n)        De(n)        Me(n)
 Ha,e(n)      Tihe(n)	  Hu(n)

Consonants

Sounds from Sanskrit-derived words
Sanskrit-based words in Urdu have the following typical vernacular compound sounds:
 bh   c_hh   dh   d^h   gh   jh   kh   ph   r^h   th   t^h

Sounds from Persian-derived words
Persian-based words in Urdu have the following typical vernacular sounds:
 C_Hi'm         Ga'f         Pe

Sounds from Arabic-derived words
Arabic-derived words in Urdu that have the following typical vernacular sounds:
 Ain     G/Hain     Fe     Qha'f     Toe     Zoe     Swa'd     Zwa'd     Se     Ha~e

See also
 Hindustani (Hindi-Urdu) word etymology
 Hindustani grammar
 Hindustani orthography
 Devanāgarī script
 Nasta'liq script
 Roman Urdu
 Urdu alphabet

References

Hindustani orthography
Urdu
Hindi

Romanization of Brahmic